Man Tracks, with the mounted police in the Australian Wilds is a 1935 book by Australian author Ion Idriess about the mounted police in north west Western Australia.

It includes profiles on aboriginal leaders such as Nemarluk and Minmara; the murder of Traynor and Fagan off Woodah Island; the spearing of Constable McColl; the ambushing of Hemming's patrol; the killing of the Japanese of the luggers' Ouida, The Myrtle, The Olga and the Raff; the spearing of Stephens and Cobb.

Idriess later wrote a follow up, Nemarluk: King of the Wilds (1941).

References

1935 non-fiction books
Books by Ion Idriess
Books about Western Australia
Australian non-fiction books
Books about Indigenous Australians
History books about Australia
Works about law enforcement
Angus & Robertson books